Juan Pablo Álvarez (born 10 February 1996) is an Argentine professional footballer who plays as a winger for Argentine Primera División side Colón, on loan from Banfield.

Career
Álvarez began his career with Banfield, with whom he had two separate youth spells. He appeared for the first-team for the first time on the substitutes bench in May 2017 for an Argentine Primera División match against Atlético Tucumán, before making his first-team debut on 1 September in a Copa Argentina Round of 32 win versus Atlético de Rafaela. His league debut came just over a week later against River Plate, he played the final seventeen minutes in a 3–1 defeat. On 3 October, Álvarez scored the first goal of his senior career in a league loss to Arsenal de Sarandí.

Career statistics
.

References

External links

1996 births
Living people
People from Tandil
Argentine footballers
Association football forwards
Argentine Primera División players
Club Atlético Banfield footballers
Club Atlético Colón footballers
Sportspeople from Buenos Aires Province